Diego Almeida Crespo (born 12 February 2004) is a professional footballer currently playing as a defender for Barcelona Juvenil A. Born in Spain, he represented Ecuador and Spain at youth international level, before making his senior debut for Ecuador in 2021.

International career
In 2018, Almeida was called up to the Ecuador national under-15 football team, the country of his parents, playing two games. Following this, he would go on to represent the country of his birth, Spain, from under-15 to under-18 level.

Following his registration to become a naturalised Ecuadorian citizen, Almeida made his debut in a 1–1 draw against El Salvador on 5 December 2021, coming on as a second half substitute for Gustavo Vallecilla.

Career statistics

Club

International

References

External links
 

2004 births
Living people
Spanish footballers
Spanish people of Ecuadorian descent
Sportspeople of Ecuadorian descent
People with acquired Ecuadorian citizenship
Ecuadorian footballers
Spain youth international footballers
Ecuador youth international footballers
Ecuador international footballers
Association football defenders
Primera Federación players
FC Barcelona Atlètic players
Footballers from Catalonia
People from Vallès Occidental
Sportspeople from the Province of Barcelona